Evil Empire: A Talk by Chalmers Johnson is a film of noted author and professor emeritus of University of California, San Diego, giving a talk to promote his book, Nemesis: The Last Days of the American Republic, the third book in his Blowback trilogy which includes Blowback: The Costs and Consequences of American Empire and The Sorrows of Empire: Militarism, Secrecy, and the End of the Republic. It is produced and directed by Jon Monday for mondayMEDIA.

Synopsis
Johnson traces the fall of the Roman Empire as a pattern he saw in American geopolitics. The term blowback is used by the CIA to mean the unintended consequences of American policies and actions in the world. His book Blowback, which was first published in January 2001, predicted the events of 9/11 as being the result of American policy.

He cites the combination of militarism, far-flung military bases around the world, unsustainable economic domestic policy, and a complacent voting population as being toxic to American democracy.

References

External links
Official site
 

2000s English-language films